Paul Friedrichs (21 March 1940; Buchholz – 30 August 2012; Erfurt) was an East German professional motocross racer. He competed in the Motocross World Championships from 1961 to 1972, most prominently as a member of the ČZ factory motocross team where he became the first three-time 500cc motocross world champion by winning three consecutive titles from 1966 to 1968.

Biography
Friedrichs grew up in Mecklenburg where he joined the motor sports clubs MC tractor Franzburg, MC Dynamo Rostock / Sportvereinigung (SV) Dynamo. With the training offered by the clubs, he developed into one of the best motocross and Enduro riders of his time. 

In 1965, he finished in second place in the 500cc world championship, behind Jeff Smith, before claiming his first world title in 1966 as a member of the ČZ factory motocross team. His was the first 500cc championship won on a two-cycle powered motocross bike and the first by a rider from the eastern 'bloc' of a divided Europe. He successfully defended his crown in 1967 and 1968, before falling to third place in the 1969 championship. Friedrichs finished second to Roger De Coster in the 1972 500cc world championship.

Friedrichs also competed in the 1972 International Six Day Trial as a member of the East Germany national team that finished second to the powerful Czechoslovakia national team.

References 

1940 births
2012 deaths
Sportspeople from Mecklenburg-Western Pomerania
East German motocross riders
Enduro riders